Achaius may refer to:

 John Capellanus (died 1147), Bishop of Glasgow nicknamed "Achaius"
 Achaius, one of the legendary kings of Scotland

See also
 Achaeus (disambiguation)